Michael A. Bennett (born August 13, 1978) is an American former professional football player who was a running back in the National Football League (NFL). He was drafted by the Minnesota Vikings 27th overall in the 2001 NFL Draft. He played college football at Wisconsin.

A Pro Bowl selection with the Vikings in 2002, Bennett was also a member of the New Orleans Saints, Kansas City Chiefs, Tampa Bay Buccaneers, San Diego Chargers, and Oakland Raiders.

Early years
Michael Bennett attended Milwaukee Trade and Technical High School. As a senior, Mike was ranked the top football player in the state, and was an All-State selection.

College career
Michael Bennett attended the University of Wisconsin–Madison and was a standout in football and in track as a sprinter. Mike spent two years as a backup to Ron Dayne, but, as a junior, Mike rushed for 1,592 yards and scored ten touchdowns, despite missing two games due to injury.

Track and field
As a junior at the 1997 state track meet, Michael Bennett set records in the 100 meter and 200 meter dashes, then broke both records as a senior in 1998. Both his 100m time of 10.33 seconds and 200m time of 20.68 seconds still stand as state records as of 2021

Personal bests

Professional career

Minnesota Vikings
Michael Bennett was selected by the Minnesota Vikings in the first round (27th overall) of the 2001 NFL Draft. As a rookie in 2001, Michael Bennett was thrust into a starting role after the sudden retirement of star running back Robert Smith. In 2002, Michael Bennett rushed for 1,296 yards and added 351 yards receiving on his way to the Pro Bowl. However, his career stalled due to injuries the following year.

The Vikings released Michael Bennett at the conclusion of the 2005 NFL season.

New Orleans Saints
Mike was signed by the New Orleans Saints to serve as the backup to Deuce McAllister. After the addition of Reggie Bush in the 2006 NFL Draft, Michael Bennett became expendable and was traded to the Kansas City Chiefs for a fourth round draft choice.

Kansas City Chiefs
Michael Bennett spent the 2006 season and part of the 2007 season with the Kansas City Chiefs. Mike played in 17 games for the Chiefs in all, carrying the ball 56 times for 252 yards and no touchdowns. Mike was traded to the Tampa Bay Buccaneers just over a month in the 2007 season.

Tampa Bay Buccaneers
On October 16, 2007 the Buccaneers acquired Bennett from the Chiefs after injuries to running backs Carnell Williams and Michael Pittman. His first touchdown as a Buccaneer came in Week 8 of the 2007 season against the Jacksonville Jaguars off a 19-yard swing pass run.

On February 15, 2008, Bennett re-signed with the Buccaneers in lieu of becoming an unrestricted free agent. Bennett was released on November 11 when Carnell Williams was activated from the PUP list.

San Diego Chargers
Bennett was claimed off waivers by the San Diego Chargers on November 12, 2008. The team released linebacker Derek Smith to make room for him on the roster. He was released on March 4, 2010. During the 2009 season with San Diego, Bennett played in six games, rushing 23 times for 65 yards, and catching six passes for 65 yards.

Oakland Raiders
Bennett signed with the Oakland Raiders on May 6, 2010. He was released on September 5, 2011. During the 2010 season with Oakland, he gained 11 yards rushing and nine yards receiving while playing in seven games.

NFL career statistics

References

External links
San Diego Chargers bio
Oakland Raiders bio
Pro Football Reference profile

1978 births
Living people
Players of American football from Milwaukee
African-American players of American football
American football running backs
National Conference Pro Bowl players
Wisconsin Badgers football players
Minnesota Vikings players
Kansas City Chiefs players
Tampa Bay Buccaneers players
San Diego Chargers players
Oakland Raiders players
American sportspeople convicted of crimes
21st-century African-American sportspeople
20th-century African-American sportspeople